Laurence Robert-Dehault (born 17 January 1964) is a French politician of the National Rally and the Member of the National Assembly for Haute-Marne's 2nd constituency since 2022.

Robert-Dehault was born in 1964 in Saint-Dizier. Her sister-in-law Élisabeth Robert-Dehaut was mayor of Saint-Dizier from 2017 to 2021 for the Les Républicains party. Robert-Dehault was a hypnotherapist before becoming a politician.

She stood for the National Rally in Haute-Marne's 2nd constituency for the 2022 French legislative election where she was elected deputy in the second round defeating incumbent François Cornut-Gentille.

References

1964 births
Living people
21st-century French politicians
21st-century French women politicians
National Rally (France) politicians
Deputies of the 16th National Assembly of the French Fifth Republic
Women members of the National Assembly (France)